Hyundai Department Store Group is a South Korean retail conglomerate that spun off from Hyundai Group in 1999. The company began as  Keumgang
Development Industries established in 1971.  It opened its first store in Ulsan in 1977.  The flagship store, in the affluent Seoul neighborhood of Apgujeong, was opened in 1985. Its major competitors are Lotte Department Store, Shinsegae, Hanwha Galleria, etc.

Group families
 Hyundai Department Store
 Hyundai Department Store Duty Free
 Hyundai Home Shopping
 Handsome 
 Hyundai Green Food
 Hyundai Livart
 Hyundai L&C
 Hyundai Rental Care
 Hyundai Dream Tour
 Hyundai Ezwel
 Hyundai Everdigm
 Hyundai Bioland

See also
Chaebol
List of South Korean retailers
Economy of South Korea
List of South Korean companies

References

External links 
 Hyundai Department Store Group

 
Retail companies of South Korea
Retail companies established in 1971